The following railroads operate in the U.S. state of Oregon.

Current railroads

Common freight carriers
 Albany and Eastern Railroad (AERC)
Operates the Venell Farms Railroad Company
 BNSF Railway (BNSF)
 Central Oregon and Pacific Railroad (CORP)
 City of Prineville Railway (COP)
 Clackamas Valley Railway (CVLY)
 Coos Bay Rail Line (CBR)
 Goose Lake Railway LLC (GOOS)
 Idaho Northern and Pacific Railroad (INPR)
 Klamath Northern Railway (KNOR)
 Mount Hood Railroad (MH)
 Oregon Eastern Railroad (OERR)
 Oregon Pacific Railroad (OPR)
 Palouse River and Coulee City Railroad (PCC)
 Peninsula Terminal Company (PT)
 Port of Tillamook Bay Railroad (POTB) (Out of Service)
 Portland and Western Railroad (PNWR)
Operates the Hampton Railway (HLSC) and the Willamette Pacific Railroad (WPRR)
 Portland Terminal Railroad (PTRC) (Operated by BNSF)
 Rogue Valley Terminal Railroad Corporation (RVT)
 Union Pacific Railroad (UP)
 Wallowa Union Railroad Authority (WURR)
 Willamette Valley Railway (WVR)
 Oregon Independence Railroad(OIRR)

Passenger carriers

Amtrak (AMTK)
Astoria Riverfront Trolley
Eagle Cap Excursion Train (WURR)
MAX Light Rail (TMTC)
Oregon, Pacific and Eastern Railway (OPE)
Oregon Coast Scenic Railroad (OCSR)
Sumpter Valley Railway
Washington Park and Zoo Railway
Westside Express Service (TMTC)
Willamette Shore Trolley
Oregon Pacific Railroad (OPR)

Private freight carriers
SP Newsprint (Newberg, Oregon)
Superior Lumber Company (Glendale, Oregon)

Defunct railroads

Private freight carriers 

 Bridal Veil Falls Lumbering Company
 Bridal Veil Lumbering Company
 Northwest Log and Lumber Company
 Black Diamond Coal Mining Company (Southport Coal Mine Railroad, 1875-1885)
 Sunset Logging Company

Passenger carriers 

 Samtrak

Electric 

 Albany Street Railway
 Astoria Electric Company
 Astoria Street Railway
 Central Railway of Oregon
 City and Suburban Railway
 East Side Railway
 Eugene and Eastern Railway
 Forest Grove Transportation Company
 Medford Coast Railroad
 Mount Hood Railway and Power Company
 Mount Scott Railway
 Multnomah Street Railway
 Oregon City and Southern Railway
 Oregon Electric Railway (OE)
 Oregon Traction Company
 Oregon Water Power and Railway Company
 Pacific Power & Light Company
 Portland Railroad and Terminal Division (PRTD)
 Portland Railway
 Portland Railway, Light and Power Company (PRL&P)
 Portland City and Oregon Railway
 Portland Consolidated Railway
 Portland Consolidated Street Railway
 Portland Electric Power Company (PEP)
 Portland, Eugene and Eastern Railway
 Portland and Fairview Railway
 Portland Traction Company (PRTD)
 Portland and Vancouver Railway
 Southern Oregon Traction Company
 Southern Pacific Company
 Trans-continental Street Railway
 Union Street and Suburban Railway
 United Railways (URC)
 Valley Railway
 Walla Walla Valley Railway (WWV)
 Walla Walla Valley Traction Company
 Waverly–Woodstock Electric Railway
 Willamette Bridge Railway
 Willamette Falls Company
 Willamette Valley Railway
 Willamette Valley Southern Railway

See also
Lists of Oregon-related topics
Rail transportation in Oregon

Notes

References

Association of American Railroads (2003), . Retrieved May 11, 2005.

Oregon
 
 
Railroads